Javier del Jesús Que Delgado (born May 6, 1995, in Campeche City, Campeche) is a Mexican professional footballer.

References

1995 births
Living people
Association football forwards
Tampico Madero F.C. footballers
Tuxtla F.C. footballers
Loros UdeC footballers
Alacranes de Durango footballers
Ascenso MX players
Liga Premier de México players
Tercera División de México players
People from Campeche City
Footballers from Campeche
Mexican footballers